Conan Neutron & the Secret Friends is a rock band formed in Oakland, California in 2015 by vocalist/guitarist/songwriter Conan Neutron and intended as a vehicle for his songwriting. Featuring Melvins drummer Dale Crover on drums and Tony Ash on bass and with production work by Toshi Kasai, their style is influenced by classic rock, noise rock and post-punk, and the live shows feature a revolving cast of players. They are a touring act predominately based in Wisconsin.

Band name
Although the first record was produced in secret, the band's name is in fact a reference to the comic series The Maxx by Sam Kieth and the concept of a "Secret Friend".

History
The band revealed itself to the world in January 2015, releasing a full-length record entitled The Enemy of Everyone, a 9-song full length that featured guest vocals by Eugene Robinson of Oxbow on the song "Fight Math". the record was dedicated to Neutron's friend Clay Wofford. R.I.P. (1977-2014), it was produced and engineered by Toshi Kasai at the Sound of Sirens studio.

2016 brought the release of the second record Art of Murder. A record directly inspired by the Hannibal Lecter series of books by Thomas Harris. Red Dragon, Silence of the Lambs and Hannibal and the interpersonal dynamics between the characters within. As well as some of the other associated material around the characters of said stories. The band cites that "Certain phrases are cited in the lyrical content and are done so with the utmost respect and admiration." It was once again produced and engineered by Toshi Kasai at Sound of Sirens.

The song "Avid Fan" was premiered on the website I Heart Noise on February 23, 2016, featuring backup vocals by Buzz Osborne of the Melvins, the critical reception was positive.

Sporadic live appearances of the band began in 2016 in cities such as Chicago, Louisville, Oakland, San Francisco and elsewhere in a "UFO like appearance schedule"
On September 17, 2016 Neutron gave an interview with  Shiny Grey Monotone where he likened the band lineup to comic book heroes The Avengers.

Further national touring ensued, as well as several single releases. this was followed by a relocation to Wisconsin by core members Tony Ash and Conan Neutron. 
 
On August 6, 2017 a digital single entitled "Conversion" was released  in conjunction with Bandcamp's day of action for Trans Rights, the song sung by Transgendered singer Ashley Altadonna of the Glacial Speed consists of lyrical matter directly related to Conversion Therapy, a pseudo-scientific practice that tries to change an individual's sexual orientation using psychological or spiritual interventions.

These songs were later issued on as part of a digital B-Sides ep entitled "Perfectly Reasonable Deviations From the Beaten Track"  along with a cover of the protopunk band Death.

2018 and 2019 brought the next set of Conan Neutron & the Secret Friends releases, a series of split singles entitled "Protons and Electrons "The "Protons and Electrons" series is a series of twelve split singles, digital and on seven-inch, where the b-side is a band that's important to the story of Secret Friends. The reason for the name is protons and electrons and neutrons make the atom. We recorded all of our sides all at once, literally the day after our current President was elected, which was a pretty surreal time to be ... well, to be doing much of anything, like drawing breath, but especially to be making music. As with the others, it was produced by Toshi Kasai at Sound of Sirens.

Ensuing "Protons and Electrons" tours covered the Mountain West and Pacific Northwest  followed by additional national and international touring in the Midwest, East Coast and Canada, mid-west and West Coast regions and more releases of these singles, including an addition on bandcamp "New and Notable" for the song Jilted dragon, followed by a video A longer run of dates, including New York City, SE Canada, west coast, mid-west and select areas of the south accompanied the release of the Protons and Electrons 2 X LP/2 X CD compilation of the singles. The compilation was largely well received  one review stating: 
"The big point here is that each of these Neutronian tracks are singular events, tirades of sharply cut and intentionally faceted perspective each attempting to see light by way of precarious manipulated shadows, the full listen is inspired and ‘lost’ in its own head to great effect."

Further media appearances included appearances on Live From the Barrage, TOMORROW WE DIE!, and The Operative, where he discussed small scale corollaries with the band and both Nick Cave as well as the work of the Birthday Party (Band), Grinderman, and Nick Cave and the Bad Seeds.

The band started off 2020 with scheduled touring, including the No Coast 2020 fest in Arlington, TX and others, but like all bands, the tour was cut short and subsequently cancelled due to COVID-19 global pandemic. This was discussed in multuple media appearances as well as Neutron's participation in the band Household Gods with David Pajo of Slint, Vern Rumsey of Unwound and Lauren K. Newman.

The third record Dark Passengers, produced with Toshi Kasai was released on Learning Curve Records. Several songs were premiered in various outlets to positive reception, mostly noting the darker tone of the songs subject matter. Described as: "A concept record about depression, imposter complex and other mental health issues."

In April 2021, Neutron appeared on The Watt from Pedro Show and announced that new material was forthcoming.

Music style
Conan Neutron & the Secret Friend's music style has been compared to the likes of Cheap Trick, Queens of the Stone Age, Afghan Whigs and The Minutemen among others, often with references to both Modern rock and Classic rock as musical touch points.
A seamless collection of the most tasty hooks, and the best delivery possible. The best in rock, and I mean that. Think about it- from Alice Cooper, to UFO, to KISS, to the Misfits, to The Melvins, to Tilts- there is a type of rock music where everything just fits, perfectly- where the production, the songwriting, the performance, heck even the tuning all just come together perfectly- that sense that everything is exactly what it's supposed to be- this record has it. There's nothing extraneous – no 3 bar solos that have to be in another key, because they won't fit, otherwise, nor jazz fakeout drum bits, nor yodelling, nor throat singing, nor funk odyssey- it's all mighty, mighty solid rock. It's beyond genre- again, like the sadly departed Tilts, this isn't cheap nostalgia for the dearly departed music from when I was 15- instead, it's trying to take the materials at hand, now- indie rock, stoner rock, sludge, noise, punk- and infusing it with a healthy dose of what made that "classic" rock classic to us, when we were 15.
So, let’s be clear- this is ROCK- like the Stooges, Radio Birdman, Melvins, or Runaways. Sure, some bits are a bit “Noise Rock”, or “Grunge” or ‘Garage rock’ or even ‘post hardcore”- but if you don’t hear “ROCK” in ALL CAPS, all the time, it might have been a little too long since you heard rock music. That’s not to say it’s dumb, teenaged, or facile. Again, check yourself sport- real rock music can simultaneously appeal to several glands at the same time. Brains include both the frontal lobes and cerebral cortex – get the idea? This is as smart as some sneering punk intellectual, but with the same swagger and balls as any bare chested Rawk Gahhhd.

Live performance
Live performances by Conan Neutron & the Secret Friends feature a number of different lineups, in an interview with the Milwaukee Record, this point was clarified citing drummer Crover's busy Melvins schedule as the reason behind the shifting lineups and a desire to work flexibly.

Live reviews often reference that there is rock and roll music being played and express the opinion that the show is entertaining and worthwhile.
"There never seemed to be a moment when Neutron was off — a perpetual showman in the best way. Conan Neutron & the Secret Friends proved that not all class clowns and creative thinkers were silenced by the Ritalin-dispensing '90s. Some of them still hit the stage and play rock music."
A human wrecking ball  sequined jackets, sweat, and song, Neutron has an enthusiasm on stage that is more than infectious, it's downright plague-inducing — incurable, unstoppable.

Podcast
Conan Neutron is also the host of the Conan Neutron's Protonic Reversal podcast.

Discography

References

External links
 Official Conan Neutron & the Secret Friends site
 The Bargain is Sealed, Child of Man, Song Premiere - Ghettoblaster Magazine, March 2015
 March 2015, Enemy of Everyone review - Mxdwn
 Avid Fan, Song Premiere - I Heart Noise, February 2016
 October 2016 - The Bay Bridged
 November 2017 - Life in Michigan
  March 18th, 2018, Noise-Rock Hero Plays Homecoming Bay Area Shows - KPIX-CBS SF Bay Area
 March 15th, 2018 Weird music by weirdos, for weirdos: Chatting with Milwaukee-via-Oakland musician Conan Neutron - Milwaukee Record

Musical groups established in 2015
Alternative rock groups from Wisconsin
Musical groups from Oakland, California
American musical trios
Grunge musical groups
American alternative metal musical groups
American noise rock music groups
American post-hardcore musical groups
2015 establishments in California